Herbert Henry Lehman (March 28, 1878 – December 5, 1963) was an American Democratic Party politician from New York. He served from 1933 until 1942 as the 45th governor of New York and represented New York State in the U.S. Senate from 1949 until 1957.

Early life and education
He was born to a Reform Jewish family in Manhattan, New York City, the son of Babetta (née Newgass) and German-born immigrant Mayer Lehman, one of the three brothers who co-founded Lehman Brothers financial services firm. His brother was New York Court of Appeals judge Irving Lehman. Herbert's father arrived from Rimpar, Germany, in 1848, settling in Montgomery, Alabama, where he engaged in the slave-era cotton business. As cotton was the most important crop of the Southern United States and global demand led to profitable business, the Lehman brothers became cotton factors, accepting cotton bales from customers as payment for their merchandise.  Cotton trading eventually became the main thrust of their business. In 1867, Mayer and Emanuel moved the company's headquarters to New York City, and helped found the New York Cotton Exchange.

He attended The Sachs School, founded by Julius Sachs. In 1895, he graduated from Sachs Collegiate Institute in New York City, and in 1899, he graduated with a B.A. from Williams College. After college, Lehman worked in textile manufacturing, eventually becoming vice-president and treasurer of the J. Spencer Turner Company in Brooklyn. In 1908, he became a partner in the investment banking firm Lehman Brothers of New York City with his brother Arthur and cousin Philip. During World War I, he became a colonel on the U.S. Army general staff. By 1928, when he entered public service, he had withdrawn entirely from business.

Politics

Lehman became active in politics in 1920 and became chairman of the finance committee of the Democratic Party in 1928 as a reward for having been a strong supporter of Alfred E. Smith. He was elected lieutenant governor of New York in 1928 and 1930 and resigned from Lehman Brothers upon taking office. He then served four terms as Governor of New York, elected in 1932 to replace Franklin D. Roosevelt (who had been running for president), and re-elected in 1934, 1936 and 1938 (when he was elected to New York's first four-year gubernatorial term). Unlike Smith, Lehman was a supporter of Roosevelt's New Deal and implemented a similar program in New York. Elements of this program included an unemployment insurance system, an improved workmen's compensation plan, minimum wage standards for women and children, and a "Little Wagner Act" to cover workers engaged in intrastate commerce. Under the original Wagner Act, workers engaged in intrastate commerce were not allowed to unionize. In 1934, Lehman refused to grant clemency to Anna Antonio, an Italian immigrant who was accused of hiring hitmen to kill her husband, who she claimed was abusive.

On December 3, 1942, he resigned the governorship less than a month before the end of his term, to accept an appointment as director of the Office of Foreign Relief and Rehabilitation Operations for the U.S. Department of State. He served as director-general of the United Nations Relief and Rehabilitation Administration from 1943 to 1946.

Lehman was the Democratic nominee for U.S. Senator from New York in 1946 and also ran on the Liberal and American Labor tickets but was defeated by the Republican candidate, Irving Ives. In 1949, he ran again, this time in a special election to serve the remainder of Robert F. Wagner's term. Lehman defeated John Foster Dulles, who had been appointed to temporarily fill the vacancy after Wagner's resignation, and he took his seat on January 3, 1950.

On October 17, 1950, New York State Supreme Court Judge Ferdinand Pecora and Senator Lehman (D-NY) gave radio addresses on behalf of the CIO-PAC during prime (10:30-11:15 P.M.).

In the campaign, he ran on the Democratic and Liberal tickets, with the American Labor Party urging their members not to vote for any candidate. In 1950, Lehman was re-elected to a full term, running on Democratic and Liberal lines and opposed by the American Labor Party.

Lehman was one of two U.S. senators who were opposed to nominating Mississippi Senator James O. Eastland to be chairman of the Senate Judiciary Committee. (The other was Wayne Morse of Oregon.) He was also an early and vocal opponent of Senator Joseph McCarthy (R-Wis.). Lehman was one of the most liberal senators and was therefore not considered part of the Senate's "club" of insiders. He retired from the Senate after his full term and was not a candidate for renomination in 1956.
In October 1941, Lillian Hellman and Ernest Hemingway co-hosted a dinner to raise money for anti-Nazi activists imprisoned in France. New York Governor Herbert Lehman agreed to participate, but withdrew because some of the sponsoring organizations, he wrote, "have long been connected with Communist activities." Hellman replied: "I do not and I did not ask the politics of any members of the committee and there is nobody who can with honesty vouch for anybody but themselves." She assured him the funds raised would be used as promised and later provided him with a detailed accounting. The next month she wrote him: "I am sure it will make you sad and ashamed as it did me to know that, of the seven resignations out of 147 sponsors, five were Jews. Of all the peoples in the world, I think, we should be the last to hold back help, on any grounds, from those who fought for us."

Retirement
After his retirement from the Senate, Lehman remained politically active, working with Eleanor Roosevelt and Thomas K. Finletter in the late 1950s and early 1960s to support the reform Democratic movement in Manhattan that eventually defeated longtime Tammany Hall boss Carmine DeSapio. He also helped to found the Lehman Children's Zoo (now the Tisch Zoo) in Central Park.

Lehman was the first, and until the 2007 inauguration of Eliot Spitzer, the only Jewish governor of New York. During much of his Senate career, he was the only Jewish Senator as well. Unlike most of his Jewish constituents, who had immigrated to the US from eastern Europe, Lehman's family was from Germany.

Lehman spent much of the last two years of his life at his New York City home. He celebrated his 85th birthday in March 1963 in increasingly poor health and died of heart failure on December 5, 1963, at age 85. Lehman is interred at Kensico Cemetery in Valhalla, New York.

Personal life
On April 28, 1910, Lehman married Edith Louise Altschul (sister of banker Frank Altschul). The couple had three children: Hilda (1921), Peter (1917), and John. Hilda, Peter and John served in the United States military during World War II; Peter was killed while on active duty. According to a group history published April 6, 1944, the governor's son was to be awarded the Distinguished Flying Cross. The medal was set to be awarded to Peter on his father's 70th birthday. Peter married and had two daughters: Penny Lehman (1940) and Wendy Lehman (1942). His daughter Hilda married thrice. In 1940, Hilda married WPA actor Boris De Vadetzky, of French Russian descent; they later divorced. In 1945, she married U.S. Army Major Eugene L. Paul; they later divorced. She married a third time which also ended in divorce. She had three children: Deborah Wise (1947), Peter Wise (1949) and Stephanie Wise (1951).

Honors
 In 1957, he received the Solomon Bublick Award from the Hebrew University of Jerusalem.
 In 1963, he was awarded the Presidential Medal of Freedom. He died the day before the ceremony.
 Lehman was awarded the Distinguished Service Medal by the U.S. Army for his service as a colonel on the Army General Staff during World War I.
 Lehman College of the City University of New York is named after him; a bust of Lehman, by sculptor John Belardo, was dedicated there in September 2005. The High School of American Studies at Lehman College is located on the campus. College dormitories are named in his honor at Williams College, the University at Buffalo, Potsdam College (SUNY), and at Binghamton University.
 A ship on the Staten Island Ferry, The Governor Herbert H. Lehman, is named for him. She was retired in 2007 after forty-two years of service and has been sold for scrap.
 There is a Herbert H. Lehman Center for American History at Columbia University. Lehman's papers were donated to the Columbia University Libraries and are housed in the social sciences librarywhich is also named in his honor. In addition, Columbia has a Herbert Lehman Professorship of Government, whose current incumbent is Mahmood Mamdani. Columbia's sister school, Barnard College, formerly had a building named in honor of Adele Lewisohn Lehman, Herbert Lehman's sister-in-law, which housed the Wollman Library. Barnard also has a "Lehman Auditorium" in Altschul Hall. Williams College, Lehman's alma mater, named a dormitory after him in 1928.
 Lehman High School (established 1974) on Westchester Square in The Bronx, New York, is named in his honor.
 In 1974, Lehman was inducted into the Jewish-American Hall of Fame.
 Liman, Israel, in northern Israel is named after him.
 A passage from testimony by Lehman for a United States House of Representatives subcommittee in 1947, "It is immigrants who brought this land the skills of their hands and brains, to make of it a beacon of opportunity and hope for all men," has been inscribed in his honor on several versions of US passport since 2004.

See also
List of Jewish members of the United States Congress

References

Further reading
 Nevins, Allan. Herbert H. Lehman and his era (1963) Scholarly biography. online
 Tananbaum, Duane.  Herbert H. Lehman: A Political Biography,  (2016) SUNY Press, Scholarly biography.
 Tananbaum, Duane.  Herbert H. Lehman:  A Jewish Patron Saint, The American Jewish Archives Journal LXXI :  1 (2019):  18-44.
 Ingalls, Robert P. Herbert H. Lehman and New York's Little New Deal, (1975) New York University Press, Scholarly history/evaluation of Lehman's governorship from 1933-1942.

External links

The Herbert H. Lehman Center for American History at Columbia University, with pictures of Lehman.
Lehman Special Correspondence Files Website at Columbia University Libraries.
Lehman's opening speech at the 1939 World's Fair in New York City, on The History Channel's Speech Archive
 
 
 

1878 births
1963 deaths
20th-century American politicians
American Reform Jews
American people of German-Jewish descent
Analysands of Paul Federn
Burials at Kensico Cemetery
Deaths from congestive heart failure
Democratic Party United States senators from New York (state)
Democratic Party governors of New York (state)
Jewish American military personnel
Jewish American people in New York (state) politics
Jewish American state governors of the United States
Jewish United States senators
Lehman Brothers people
Lehman College
Lehman family
Lieutenant Governors of New York (state)
Military personnel from New York City
Politicians from New York City
Presidential Medal of Freedom recipients
Solomon Bublick Award recipients
United States Army personnel of World War I
Williams College alumni